Larionovskaya is a rural locality (a village) in Semizerye Rural Settlement, Kaduysky District, Vologda Oblast, Russia. The population was 42 as of 2002.

Geography 
Larionovskaya is located 62 km northwest of Kaduy (the district's administrative centre) by road. Baranovskaya is the nearest rural locality.

References 

Rural localities in Kaduysky District